Seven, Come Eleven is a live album by jazz guitarists Herb Ellis and Joe Pass that was released in 1974.

Reception

In his Allmusic review, critic Scott Yanow wrote "Although Pass would soon be recognized as a giant, Ellis battles him to a draw on this frequently exciting bop-oriented date..."

Track listing
 "In a Mellow Tone" (Duke Ellington, Milt Gabler) – 7:32
 "Seven Come Eleven" (Charlie Christian, Benny Goodman) – 5:09
 "Prelude to a Kiss" (Duke Ellington, Irving Mills, Mack Gordon) – 5:34
 "Perdido" (Juan Tizol, Ervin Drake, H. J. Lengsfelder) – 4:51
 "(I'm) Confessin' (That I Love You)" (Doc Daugherty, Al Neiburg, Ellis Reynolds) – 5:12
 "Easy Living" (Ralph Rainger, Leo Robin) – 4:32
 "Concord Blues" (Herb Ellis, Joe Pass) – 8:49

Personnel
 Herb Ellis – guitar
 Joe Pass  – guitar
 Ray Brown – bass
 Jake Hanna – drums

References

External links
Concord Records entry

Herb Ellis live albums
Joe Pass live albums
1973 live albums
albums produced by Carl Jefferson
Concord Records live albums